Luca Tesconi (born January 3, 1982) is an Italian sports shooter who won a silver medal at the 2012 Summer Olympics.

Biography
On 28 July, he won the 10m air pistol silver for Italy, in London Olympics 2012.

References

External links
 

Living people
1982 births
Italian male sport shooters
People from Pietrasanta
ISSF pistol shooters
Olympic shooters of Italy
Shooters at the 2012 Summer Olympics
Olympic silver medalists for Italy
Olympic medalists in shooting
Medalists at the 2012 Summer Olympics
Shooters at the 2015 European Games
European Games competitors for Italy
Shooters of Centro Sportivo Carabinieri
Sportspeople from the Province of Lucca
21st-century Italian people